Enrico Barbaranelli (born 24 May 1968) is an Italian lightweight rower. He won a gold medal at the 1988 World Rowing Championships in Milan with the lightweight men's eight.

References

1968 births
Living people
Italian male rowers
World Rowing Championships medalists for Italy